Andrey Valeryevich Kartapolov (born 9 November 1963) is a Russian politician and former army officer of the Russian Army. From 30 July 2018 to October 2021 he served as Deputy Defence Minister, and headed the Main Military-Political Directorate of the Russian Armed Forces. He had commanded the Western Military District from 2015 to 2016, and again from 2017 to 2018. Kartapolov has held the rank of colonel general since 2015. He is currently a member of parliament, a deputy of the State Duma, elected on 19 September 2021.

Biography

Andrey Kartapolov was born in Weimar, East Germany, on 9 November 1963. He graduated from the Moscow Higher Combined Arms Command School named after the Supreme Soviet of the RSFSR in 1985, the Frunze Military Academy in 1993, and the Military Academy of the General Staff of the Armed Forces of Russia in 2007.

Kartapolov rose from platoon commander to commander of a motorized rifle division in the Group of Soviet Forces in Germany, the Western Group of Forces, and the Far Eastern Military District. From 2007 to 2008, he was the Deputy Army Commander in the Siberian Military District, and from 2008 to 2009, he was the Chief of Staff of the 22nd Guards Army in the Moscow Military District.

From May 2010 to January 2012, Kartapolov was the Commander of the 58th Army of the North Caucasus, then the Southern Military District. Between January 2012 and February 2013, he was the Deputy Commander of the Southern Military District. On 13 December 2012, Kartapolov was awarded the rank of lieutenant general. From February 2013 to June 2014, he was the Chief of Staff of the Western Military District, and between June 2014 and 9 November 2015, he was the Chief of the Main Operations Directorate - Deputy Chief of the General Staff of the Armed Forces of Russia.

On 11 June 2015, Kartapolov was promoted to colonel general. On 10 November 2015, Kartapolov was appointed commander of the Western Military District. On 23 November 2015, he was presented by the Minister of Defense, Sergey Shoygu, to the leadership of the Western Military District and he was awarded the standard of the commander of the district. From 19 December 2016 to March 2017, Kartapolov was the commander of the Russian group of forces in Syria. During his command after an operation involving Russian aviation and Russian Special Operations Forces on 2 March 2017, Palmyra was returned to the control of the Syrian government for the second time.

On 30 July 2018, by decree of the President of Russia, Kartapolov was appointed Deputy Minister of Defense, the Head of the Main Military-Political Directorate. He thus became the ninth Deputy Minister of Defense of Russia and headed the GVPU, recreated on the same day, to strengthen military-patriotic education in the Armed Forces of Russia. On 9 August 2018, he was presented to the personnel, on 31 August 2018, the Minister of Defense, Shoygu, presented him with a personal standard. In addition to the Main Military-Political Directorate, Kartapolov is subordinate to the Department of Culture of the Ministry of Defense, the Directorate of the Ministry of Defense, for work with citizens' appeals and the Military Heraldic Service of the Armed Forces of Russia.

On 18 November 2019, the Decree of the President of Russia, No. 561, Kartapolov was included in the Heraldic Council of the President of the Russian Federation. 

He is a member of the Collegium of the Ministry of Defense.

At the end of April 2021, Kartapolov applied for participation in the primaries of the United Russia party. If he wins, he will participate in the upcoming elections to the State Duma on a party list in Moscow.

On 5 October 2021, by decree of the President of Russia, Kartapolov was relieved of his post as head of the Main Military-Political Directorate and released from military service in connection with his transfer to work in the State Duma.

He is one of the members of the State Duma the United States Treasury sanctioned on 24 March 2022 in response to the 2022 Russian invasion of Ukraine.

Controversies

Allegations of involvement in the destruction of MH17

On 17 July 2014, a Buk-M1 missile, according to unofficial foreign experts, from the 53rd Anti-Aircraft Missile Brigade of the Russian Air Defense, shot down a Boeing 777 belonging to Malaysian Airlines over the territory of Ukraine, killing 298 people. According to an unofficial international research group investigating the disaster, Buk-M1 installations were secretly transferred to Ukraine in June 2014. The 53rd Anti-Aircraft Missile Brigade of the Air Defense belongs to the Western Military District, of which Kartapolov was the chief of staff at that time. Thus, according to experts, the transfer of anti-aircraft systems by his subordinates to the territory of Ukraine and the attack of air targets over its territory took place with his knowledge and on his order.

Allegations of involvement in fabricating false evidence

On 21 July 2014, Kartapolov, taking part in a press conference of the Ministry of Defense, said that the means of radar surveillance of the Ministry of Defense recorded that shortly before the crash, a Su-25 aircraft of the Armed Forces of Ukraine was flying at a distance of 3-5 km from the Malaysian Boeing. According to statements published on the Bellingcat website, a check carried out by international experts showed that the data provided by Kartapolov was deliberately fabricated and no Ukrainian military aircraft were recorded in the vicinity of Boeing on the day of the crash. The Ministry of Defense declared that these conclusions were far-fetched. 

On 16 February 2015, the European Union included him in the sanctions list of persons whose assets are frozen in the EU and in respect of whom visa restrictions have been introduced. 

On 26 September 2016, at a briefing by the Russian Ministry of Defense, Deputy Chief Designer of the Lianozovsky Electromechanical Plant Research and Production Association Viktor Meshcheryakov said that the Utyos T radar complex showed that there were no third-party air objects near the Malaysian aircraft. This statement was made in the presence of the official representative of the Ministry of Defense, Major General Igor Konashenkov and the head of the radio-technical troops of the Aerospace Forces, Major General Andrey Koban. This information is an actual refutation of Kartapolov's statement two years earlier.

References

1963 births
Living people
Military personnel from Weimar
Russian colonel generals
Recipients of the Order "For Merit to the Fatherland", 3rd class
Recipients of the Order "For Merit to the Fatherland", 4th class
Recipients of the Order of Courage
Recipients of the Order of Military Merit (Russia)
Frunze Military Academy alumni
Military Academy of the General Staff of the Armed Forces of Russia alumni
Russian military personnel of the Syrian civil war
Eighth convocation members of the State Duma (Russian Federation)
Russian individuals subject to European Union sanctions
Russian individuals subject to the U.S. Department of the Treasury sanctions
Deputy Defence Ministers of Russia
Malaysia Airlines Flight 17